Joseph Edward Morris (born September 15, 1960) is an American former professional football player who was a running back in the National Football League (NFL) for the New York Giants from 1982 to 1988.  Initially noted for his diminutive stature — 5' 7", Morris was a key member of the Giants team that won Super Bowl XXI in 1987.  He rushed for 67 yards, caught four passes for 20 yards, and scored a touchdown in the game.

College career
While playing scholastic sports at Ayer High School in Ayer, Massachusetts, Morris was an All-State in two sports.  Morris was a four-year starter at Syracuse University.  At Syracuse, Morris set all of the all-time rushing records rushing for 4,229 yards in his four seasons surpassing former greats such as Jim Brown, Larry Csonka and Floyd Little.  An All-American choice by his senior year, he was selected to play in the Blue–Gray, East–West Shrine and Senior Bowl games before signing on with the New York Giants. Morris was also co-captain with Ike Bogosian, father of NHL player Zach Bogosian.

Professional career
Morris was the New York Giants' second round pick in the 1982 NFL Draft, and quickly outshined their first round pick, University of Michigan back Butch Woolfolk. As a rookie with the Giants in 1982, Morris scored a touchdown on his very first rushing attempt; a prelude of what was to come for this powerful running back. In 1985, he rushed for 1,336 yards and a league leading 21 touchdowns, and rushed for 141 yards in their 17–3 postseason win over the San Francisco 49ers. Morris was a key member of the '86 Giants Super Bowl championship team rushing his way to a 1,000 yard season. He went on to add two more 1,000 plus yard rushing seasons, moving past Alex Webster as the all-time Giants leader.
 
In the Giants' march to the Lombardi Trophy, Morris rushed for 313 yards in three playoff games including a 159-yard, two touchdown performance against the San Francisco 49ers. He was selected to the Pro Bowl in '85 and '86 seasons and also received All-NFL Honors for his performance those two years. Towards the end of the 1988 season, he totaled 1,318 attempts, 5,296 yards and 48 touchdowns for the New York Giants.  Morris retired from professional football in 1991 with the Cleveland Browns and finished his NFL career with 5,585 rushing yards, 111 receptions for 960 yards, and 52 touchdowns.

Giants Franchise Records
's NFL off-season, Joe Morris held at least 19 Giants franchise records, most related to his prolific post-season career with the club. These records include:
 Most Rush Attempts (playoff career): 140
 Most Rush Attempts (playoff season): 73 (1986)
 Most Rush Yards (playoff career): 553
 Most Rush Yards (playoff season): 313 (1986)
 Most Rush Yds/Att (playoff game): 6.63 (1987-01-04 SFO)
 Most Rushing TDs (season): 21 (1985)
 Most Rushing TDs (playoff career): 4 (Tied with Brandon Jacobs)
 Most Rushing TDs (playoff season): 4 (1986)
 Most Rushing TDs (playoff game): 2 (1987-01-04 SFO; tied with Rodney Hampton)
 Most Rush Yds/Game (playoff career): 79
 Most Total TDs (season): 21 (1985)
 Most Total TDs (playoff season): 4 (1986; tied with Brandon Jacobs and Hakeem Nicks)
 Most 100+ yard rushing games (season): 9 (1986; tied with Tiki Barber)
 Most 100+ yard rushing games (playoffs): 2 (NA; tied with Ottis Anderson and Tiki Barber)
 Most Games with 1+ TD scored (season): 13 (1986; tied with Ottis Anderson)
 Most Games with 2+ TD scored (career): 15 (Tied with Brandon Jacobs)
 Most Games with 2+ TD scored (season): 7 (1985)
 Most Games with 3+ TD scored (career): 6
 Most Games with 3+ TD scored (season): 4 (1985)

After football
Morris now works in real estate and insurance.  He resides in New Jersey with his two children.  He was also a part owner of the New Jersey Red Dogs of the Arena Football League, along with fellow ex-Giants Carl Banks and Harry Carson.

Family
Morris had two younger brothers follow him to Syracuse University.  Mike was a wide receiver and Larry was a running back.  Morris' youngest brother, Jamie Morris set the all-time rushing records at the University of Michigan.

See also

History of the New York Giants (1979–1993)

References

1960 births
Living people
Sportspeople from Fayetteville, North Carolina
American football running backs
Syracuse Orange football players
New York Giants players
Cleveland Browns players
National Conference Pro Bowl players
Arena Football League executives
Players of American football from North Carolina
People from Ayer, Massachusetts
Players of American football from Massachusetts
People from Fort Bragg, North Carolina
Sportspeople from Middlesex County, Massachusetts